Nagiella is a genus of moths of the family Crambidae. It was established by Eugene G. Munroe in 1964 as a replacement name for Nagia Walker, 1866, a name that was preoccupied by Nagia Walker, 1858 in the Lepidoptera family Erebidae.

Distribution
The six species of Nagiella are distributed in East and Southeast Asia as well as the Indian subcontinent.

Larval foodplants
The caterpillars of Nagiella inferior have been recorded on Coffea liberica in the Rubiaceae family.

Species
Nagiella bispina Lu & Du, 2020
Nagiella hortulatoides Munroe, 1976
Nagiella inferior (Hampson, 1899) (syn. Botys quadrimaculalis (Motschultsky, 1861))
Nagiella occultalis Ullah & Yang in Ullah, Yang, Qiao & Zhang, 2017
Nagiella quadrimaculalis (Kollar & Redtenbacher, 1844) (syn. Nagiella desmialis (Walker, 1866))
Nagiella tristalis Matsui & Naka in Matsui, Naka & Jinbo, 2021

Systematics
In the past, the genus was considered a synonym of Pleuroptya, until in 2017 a taxonomic revision showed that Nagiella is not identical with Pleuroptya and was reinstated as a valid genus.

Nagiella is placed in the tribe Agroterini of the subfamily Spilomelinae.

The type species, Nagia desmialis Walker, 1865, is now considered a synonym of Nagiella quadrimaculalis (Kollar & Redtenbacher, 1844), which was described earlier and therefore has priority over the younger name.

References

Natural History Museum Lepidoptera genus database

Spilomelinae
Crambidae genera
Taxa named by Eugene G. Munroe